The Eastern States Hockey League (ESHL) was an American Tier III Junior ice hockey league. On Labor Day 2011, the Continental Hockey Association officially changed its name to the Eastern States Hockey League. After the 2012–13 season, the ESHL disbanded after several teams left to join the newly renamed Eastern Hockey League or one of the newly formed United States Premier Hockey League Elite or Empire Divisions.

Former teams

Indiana Thunder
New Jersey Jr Titans
Mass Maple Leafs 
Metro Fighting Moose
Michigan Mountain Cats 
Philadelphia Jr. Blazers
Pittsburgh Amateur Penguins South
Pittsburgh Jr. Penguins
Potomac Patriots
Reading Rails
South Shore Kings
Vineland Junior Eagles

References

External links
 CHA Website

3